The Honam Line is a major railway line serving the Honam region (North and South Jeolla Provinces) in South Korea.  The line is served by frequent passenger trains from Seoul (via the Gyeongbu Line) to Gwangju and Mokpo.

History

A Honam Railway from Seoul to Mokpo was first proposed in 1896 by a French company.  After the start of the Russo-Japanese War, in May 1904, Imperial Japan forced Korea to sign an agreement granting the Japanese military control over railways, including the right to seize land.  Japan the seized much of the fertile Honam plain in advance of a planned Honam Line.

The construction of the line started in 1910.  The first  between Daejeon and Yeonsan was opened in July 1911.  The line was extended to Ganggyeong in November 1911, to Iri (today Iksan) in March 1912, to Gimje in October 1912 and to Jeongeup in December 1912.  Construction continued from the other end of the line, with the section from Mokpo to Hakgyo (today Hampyeong) opened in May 1913; and extended to Naju in July 1913, to Songjeong-ri (today Gwangju·Songjeong) in October 1913, and finally to Jeongeup, completing the line on January 11, 1914.

Upgrade

Duplication 
The Honam Line was upgraded to an electrified and double-tracked line for higher speeds in stages. Double-tracking construction work started in 1968. Double-tracking of the last remaining single-track section, Songjeong–Mokpo, and the electrification of the whole line, including the Gwangju spur, was finished for the start of Korea Train Express (KTX) services on April 1, 2004.

Speeding-up upgrade 
To serve KTX and SRT, section from GwangjuSongjeong to Gomagwon was upgraded to accomplish maximum speed of 230 km/h. Total length of the project is 25.9 km and it was completed in June 2020.

Major stations

Major stations and junctions along the line include:

Daejeon, junction with the Gyeongbu Line to Seoul and Busan;
Seodaejeon, the Daejeon passenger station for Honam Line trains;
Iksan (formerly named Iri), the terminus of the Jeolla and Janghang Lines;
GwangjuSongjeong, the major station in Gwangju for through trains to Mokpo, and the junction with the Gyeongjeon Line;
Naju, the major station in Naju;
Mokpo, a seaport on the south coast.

Services

The Honam Line is served by freight trains, as well as cross-country Mugunghwa-ho, intercity ITX-Saemaeul and high-speed KTX passenger trains.

As of October 2010, the minimum travel time from Yongsan Station in Seoul to Mokpo in South Jeolla is a minimum of 4 hours 42 minutes by ITX-Saemaeul and a minimum of 5 hours 2 minutes by Mugunghwa. On the Honam Line itself, from Seodaejeon to Mokpo, travel time is a minimum of 2 hours 51 minutes by ITX-Saemaeul and a minimum of 3 hours 5 minutes by Mugunghwa.

See also
Transportation in South Korea
Korail

References

Railway lines in South Korea
Railway lines opened in 1914